The 1980 Dayton Pro Tennis Classic, was a men's tennis tournament played on indoor carpet courts at the Dayton Convention Center in Dayton, Ohio, in the United States that was part of the 1980 Grand Prix. It was the seventh and last edition of the event and was held from March 24 through March 30, 1980. First-seeded Wojciech Fibak won the singles title and earned $15,000 first-prize money.

Finals

Singles
 Wojciech Fibak defeated  Bruce Manson 7–6(7–4), 6–3
 It was Fibak's 1st singles title of the year and the 9th of his career.

Doubles
 Wojciech Fibak  /  Geoff Masters defeated  Fritz Buehning /  Fred McNair 6–4, 6–4

References

External links
 ITF tournament edition details

Dayton Pro Tennis Classic
Dayton Pro Tennis Classic
Dayton Pro Tennis Classic